Johnny Morris Davis (born July 15, 1962) is an American former kickboxer who competed in the welterweight and middleweight divisions. Nicknamed "Superfoot", Davis held numerous titles including two world championships.

Career
Johnny Davis was born in Dillon, South Carolina, and currently resides in the Carolinas. He began martial arts training in karate and eventually reached the rank of second degree black belt. After a successful run competing in point fighting tournaments, he made the jump to full contact kickboxing.

From 1980 to 1984, he won numerous regional kickboxing titles before beating Alvin Prouder for the PKA World Welterweight Championship in Denver, Colorado on February 2, 1985.  In 1987, he won the FFKA Championship and also won the ISKA U.S. Middleweight Championship that year in a bout featured on ESPN. Davis' final record was 25 wins and 6 losses, with 13 wins by knockout.

Davis retired in 1988 but continued to stay involved in martial arts. In 1996, he promoted several kickboxing matches in California and became involved with the IKF. In 2002, he released an autobiographical training manual entitled The Art of Kickboxing, and started his own promotional company, AK Promotions.

Championships and awards

Kickboxing
Fight Factory Karate Association
FFKA World Championship
International Sport Karate Association
ISKA United States Middleweight (-75 kg/165.3 lb) Full Contact Championship
Professional Karate Association
PKA North Carolina Light Middleweight Championship
PKA South Eastern Welterweight Championship
PKA East Coast Welterweight Championship
PKA World Welterweight Championship

Kickboxing record

|-
|-  bgcolor="#CCFFCC"
| 1985-02-02 || Win ||align=left| Alvin Prouder || || Denver, Colorado, USA || || || 
|-
! style=background:white colspan=9 |
|-
|-
| colspan=9 | Legend:

References

External links
 IKF profile
 

Living people
1962 births
American male kickboxers
Kickboxers from South Carolina
Kickboxers from California
Welterweight kickboxers
Middleweight kickboxers
American male karateka
People from Dillon, South Carolina
People from Rocklin, California
African-American sportsmen
21st-century African-American people
20th-century African-American sportspeople